Dipnorhynchus is an extinct genus of lungfish from the middle Devonian period of Australia and Europe.

Dipnorhynchus was a primitive lungfish, but still it had features that set it apart from other sarcopterygians. Its skull lacked the joint that divided the skull in two in rhipidists and coelacanths. Instead, it was a solid bony structure similar to that of the first tetrapods. Instead of cheek teeth, Dipnorhynchus had tooth-like plates on the palate and lower jaw. Also like land vertebrates, the palate was fused with the brain case.

References

Prehistoric lungfish genera
Devonian bony fish
Devonian fish of Europe
Prehistoric fish of Australia